Claude W. English (born December 26, 1946 in Columbus, Georgia) is a retired American basketball player and coach who spent one season in the National Basketball Association (NBA) with the Portland Trail Blazers during their inaugural 1970–71 season. He was drafted by the Blazers in the seventh round (110 pick overall) during the 1970 NBA Draft from the University of Rhode Island.

Coaching/Athletic Director Career
English returned to the University of Rhode Island, where he began a tenure as an assistant basketball coach shortly after his NBA career ended. English then served as the head coach at Rhode Island from 1980 to 1984.

Since 1996, English has served as the Athletic Director at Park University in Parkville, Missouri. English served as head men's basketball coach at Park University from 1992 through 2005, being named the American Midwest Conference Coach of the Year in 1996 and in 1998. In 2010, English was inducted into the McLendon Minority Athletics Administrators Hall of Fame in Anaheim, California. In 2011, English was inducted into the Chattahoochee Valley Sports Hall of Fame, in his hometown of Phenix City, Alabama. In 2017, English was named the American Midwest Conference Athletic Director of the Year.

Of his Athletic Director career, English said "I’m just a coach who coaches the coaches. That’s the way I always see my job. I want to motivate other people the way I’m motivated."

References

External links

Living people
1946 births
American men's basketball coaches
American men's basketball players
Basketball coaches from Georgia (U.S. state)
Basketball players from Columbus, Georgia
College men's basketball head coaches in the United States
Hartford Capitols players
Portland Trail Blazers draft picks
Portland Trail Blazers players
Rhode Island Rams men's basketball coaches
Rhode Island Rams men's basketball players
Small forwards
Sportspeople from Columbus, Georgia
Park University